Apavatn is a lake in southwest Iceland. With a surface area of around 13 km2 it is much larger than the neighbouring lake of Laugarvatn, which lies to the north of Apavatn.

Apavatn is renowned for its good fishing, especially trout.

See also
List of lakes of Iceland

References

External links
https://web.archive.org/web/20040513214304/http://nat.is/nateng/apavatn.htm (Information)
http://www.arctic-images.com/picture_gallery/Hot/hot_pages/pages/Apavatn.htm (Photo)

Lakes of Iceland